Houndberry is a common name for several plants and may refer to:

The shrub dogwood (Cornus sanguinea), or its fruit
The plant black nightshade (Solanum nigrum), or its fruit